The Retford Times is a weekly local newspaper founded in 1869. It is distributed in and around the area of the North Nottinghamshire market town of Retford.  The newspaper contains local news and views from resident people as well as a property section for Retford and the surrounding villages. The Retford Times is headquartered at a recently completed structure on West Street. They moved from their former offices on Chancery Lane where they were based since 1928. In 2012, Local World acquired owner Northcliffe Media from Daily Mail and General Trust.

According to the most recent audited accounts for the period January to December 2020, the circulation of the newspaper is approximately 2,549.

See also
Retford

References

External links
Retford Times website

Northcliffe Media
Weekly newspapers published in the United Kingdom
Retford
Publications established in 1869
1869 establishments in England